Robot welding is the use of mechanized programmable tools (robots), which completely automate a welding process by both performing the weld and handling the part.  Processes such as gas metal arc welding, while often automated, are not necessarily equivalent to robot welding, since a human operator sometimes prepares the materials to be welded.  Robot welding is commonly used for resistance spot welding and arc welding in high production applications, such as the automotive industry.

History 
Robot welding is a relatively new application of robotics, even though robots were first introduced into U.S. industry during the 1960s. The use of robots in welding did not take off until the 1980s, when the automotive industry began using robots extensively for spot welding. Since then, both the number of robots used in industry and the number of their applications has grown greatly.  In 2005, more than 120,000 robots were in use in North American industry, about half of them for welding. Growth is primarily limited by high equipment costs, and the resulting restriction to high-production applications. 

Robot arc welding has begun growing quickly just recently, and already it commands about 20 percent of industrial robot applications.  The major components of arc welding robots are the manipulator or the mechanical unit and the controller, which acts as the robot's "brain".  The manipulator is what makes the robot move, and the design of these systems can be categorized into several common types, such as SCARA and cartesian coordinate robot, which use different coordinate systems to direct the arms of the machine.

The robot may weld a pre-programmed position, be guided by machine vision, or by a combination of the two methods. However, the many benefits of robotic welding have proven to make it a technology that helps many original equipment manufacturers increase accuracy, repeat-ability, and throughput  One welding robot can do the work of several human welders. For example, in arc welding, which produces hot sparks and smoke, a human welder can keep his torch on the work for roughly thirty percent of the time; for robots, the percentage is about 90. 

The technology of signature image processing has been developed since the late 1990s for analyzing electrical data in real time collected from automated, robotic welding, thus enabling the optimization of welds.

Advantages 
Advantages of robot welding include: 

 Increased productivity
 Decreased risk of injury 
 Lower production costs
 Reduced cost of labor 
 Consistent quality
 Reduced waste

Disadvantages 
Disadvantages of robot welding include:

 Lost jobs and wages 
 High cost of machinery and installation 
 Cost of specialized training 
 Limited functionality 
 Delayed quality control

References

External links

Robotic equipment
Robotic welding video
 ABB Robotics
 ABB arc welding equipment
 ABB spot welding equipment
 FANUC welding robots
 FANUC arc welding robots
 FANUC spot welding robots
 ABICOR BINZEL Through-arm Robot Welding Torches
 Robotic Friction Stir Welding video
 Novarc Technologies Spool Welding Robot In Action
 AutoMetrics Manufacturing Technologies Inc

Welding
Welding